Yoshie Fruchter (born February 1, 1982) is an American experimental jazz guitarist, bassist, oud player and composer.

Early life and education
Fruchter was born and raised in Silver Spring, Maryland, in an Orthodox Jewish household, singing and playing Jewish music in his youth. His father is a musician, and his sister Temim is the former drummer of the indie punk band The Shondes. He studied jazz in the music department at the University of Maryland, and moved to Brooklyn, New York, in 2005.

Music career

Pitom
Fruchter's debut solo album as composer and guitarist, Pitom, was released in 2008. The Wall Street Journal called it "a dazzling debut" and JazzTimes called the debut "audacious," describing it as klezmer music with a punk sensibility. "Pitom" is Hebrew for "Suddenly," and the album was named after his band, which, along with Fruchter on guitar, includes Jeremy Brown (violin), Shanir Blumenkranz (bass) and Kevin Zubek (drums).

Pitom's second album, Blasphemy and Other Serious Crimes, was released in 2011. Fruchter again composed and played guitar, with the album further exploring Jewish music along with surf and sludge metal influences. The album was chosen by The Forward as one of the newspaper's 2011 Forward Fives, an annual list honoring five of the most important Jewish music releases of the year.

Fruchter's music combines elements of jazz, klezmer, rock, surf and heavy metal, while exploring themes of God, religion, repentance and redemption. Both Pitom albums have been released on John Zorn's Tzadik Records label. Fruchter has been described as a member of the "Radical Jewish Culture" scene, a term coined by Zorn.

Schizophonia
In December 2014, Fruchter released Cantorial Recordings Reimagined, an album with a new band called Schizophonia, in which he arranged Jewish cantorial recordings for a progressive rock quintet, with world music influences. Also in the band are Shanir Blumenkranz (bass), Brian Marsella (keyboards), Yonadav Halevy (drums) and Rich Stein (percussion).

Other projects
In 2006, Fruchter collaborated with his father, Chaim (Harold) Fruchter on Beyond the Book, an album of songs they co-wrote and produced that explore critical moments in the lives of various Biblical personalities.

Fruchter is a member of Jon Madof's 13-piece afrobeat group Zion80, playing guitar on the group's self-titled 2013 debut. In April 2014, Zion80 released its second album, Adramelech, an interpretation of John Zorn's Masada Book 2: The Book of Angels, on which Fruchter again played guitar.

Fruchter is also a frequent substitute with the instrumental rock quartet Abraxas, which also performs the music of Zorn's Masada; a member of Pakistani/American collaboration Sandaraa; doom metal band Deveykus; and Frank London's Shekhina Big Band, among other projects, many of which explore the relationship of Jewish culture, identity and music.

Personal life
Fruchter resides in Brooklyn, New York, with his wife, journalist Leah Koenig, and their son. He is an observant Orthodox Jew.

Discography

Albums

Appears on

References

External links
 Official website

21st-century American bass guitarists
American jazz guitarists
American experimental guitarists
American male bass guitarists
American jazz bass guitarists
American experimental musicians
American oud players
American mandolinists
Jewish American musicians
Jewish American jazz composers
Klezmer musicians
Tzadik Records artists
1982 births
Living people
American Orthodox Jews
People from Silver Spring, Maryland
Musicians from Brooklyn
University of Maryland, College Park alumni
Guitarists from Maryland
Jewish jazz musicians
Moshav (band) members
Soulfarm members
Guitarists from New York (state)
Jazz musicians from New York (state)
Jazz musicians from Maryland
American male jazz composers
American jazz composers
21st-century American male musicians